A Fairy Festival, Faery Festival, or Fairy Fayre is an outdoor gathering typically including costuming, handicrafts, music or other entertainment, and food. Fairy Festivals are sometimes considered a form of Renaissance fair, although they lack historical basis and the depiction of fairies, it is generally based on Victorian Romanticism rather than historical lore.

Notable events
 3 Wishes Fairy Festival in Cornwall 

 Avalon Faery Fayre in Glastonbury
 The Fairy And Human Relations Congress in 
Washington state

 Feenfest in Saalfeld, Germany

References

Festivals